Gina Crampton (born 7 December 1991) is a New Zealand netball international. She was a member of the New Zealand teams that won the 2019 Netball World Cup and the 2021 Constellation Cup. Crampton was also a member of the Southern Steel teams that won the 2017 and 2018 ANZ Premierships. She was named the 2016 New Zealand ANZ Championship Player of the Year and the 2019 ANZ Premiership Player of the Year. Crampton has captained both Southern Steel and New Zealand. Since 2021 she has played for Northern Stars.

Early life, family and education
Crampton grew up in Wellington. She is the daughter of Ngaire and Colin Crampton. She has one brother, Flynn. Colin Crampton, played basketball for Nelson Giants and New Zealand in the 1980s. He later became chief executive of Wellington Water. Between 2005 and 2009, Crampton attended Wellington Girls' College. In 2009 she captained the school netball team as they played in national secondary schools tournaments. In 2010 she moved to Dunedin to study physical education at the University of Otago. She completed her studies Otago Polytechnic.

Playing career

Lois Muir Challenge
In 2010 and 2011, Crampton represented Netball Otago in the Lois Muir Challenge, a second level New Zealand netball competition that was played concurrently with the ANZ Championship. In 2012 she played for Otago-Southland Remarkables, a combined Netball Otago and Netball Southland team. She was named the 2012 Remarkables MVP.

Southern Steel
Between 2012 and 2020, Crampton made 98 senior appearances for Southern Steel, initially in the ANZ Championship and later in the ANZ Premiership. In 2016 she was a member of the Steel team that finished the season as ANZ Championship minor premiers. She was subsequently named the 2016 New Zealand ANZ Championship Player of the Year. In 2017 she was a member of the Steel team that won both the inaugural ANZ Premiership and Super Club titles. In 2018 she was vice-captain to Wendy Frew as Steel went onto to retain their title. In 2019 and 2020, together with Te Huinga Reo Selby-Rickit, Crampton co-captained Steel.
In 2019 Crampton was also named the ANZ Premiership Player of the Year.

Northern Stars
In September 2020, it was announced that Crampton would be switching from Southern Steel to Northern Stars for the 2021 ANZ Premiership season. In May 2021, in a Round 2 match against Mainland Tactix, Crampton made her 100th senior league appearance.

ANZ Premiership statistics

|- style="background-color: #eaeaea"
! scope="row" style="text-align:center" |2017
|style="text-align:center;"|Steel
|0/0||?||0||422||?||3||10||28||22||16 
|- 
! scope="row" style="text-align:center" |2018
|style="text-align:center;"|Steel
|0/0||?||0||462||?||9||14||42||72||17  
|- style="background-color: #eaeaea"
! scope="row" style="text-align:center" |2019
|style="text-align:center;"|Steel
|0/0||?||0||364||686||8||10||19||61||16  
|- 
! scope="row" style="text-align:center" |2020
|style="text-align:center;"|Steel
|0/0||?||0||319||434||4||7||31||33||14  
|- style="background-color: #eaeaea"
! scope="row" style="text-align:center" |2021
|style="text-align:center;"|Stars
|0/0||?||0||359||642||3||5||30||44||15 
|- 
! scope="row" style="text-align:center" | 2022
|style="text-align:center;"|Stars
|0/0|| ||  || || || || || || || 
|- class="sortbottom"
! colspan=2| Career
! 
! 
! 
! 
! 
! 
! 
! 
! 
! 
|}

New Zealand
Crampton made her senior debut for New Zealand on 9 October 2016  in the first test of the 2016 Constellation Cup series against Australia. She had previously represented New Zealand at under-21 level and won the Aspiring Silver Fern award at the 2015 New Zealand Netball Awards. She was a prominent member of the New Zealand team that won the 2019 Netball World Cup. 
Ahead of the 2020 Netball Nations Cup, Crampton was included in the New Zealand   leadership group. Together with Jane Watson, she was named vice captain as Ameliaranne Ekenasio became captain. She was also a member of the New Zealand team that won the 2021 Constellation Cup. On 3 March 2021, during the same series, Crampton, alongside Watson, co-captained the team in the absence of Ekenasio. She was subsequently appointed New Zealand captain for the 2021 Taini Jamison Trophy Series, the 2022 Netball Quad Series and the 2022 Commonwealth Games.

Personal life
Crampton is in a relationship with Faʻasui Fuatai, a former New Zealand national rugby sevens team and under-20 rugby union team player.

Honours
New Zealand
Netball World Cup
Winners: 2019
Constellation Cup
Winners: 2021 
Taini Jamison Trophy
Winners: 2020
Fast5 Netball World Series
Winners: 2016 
Southern Steel
ANZ Premiership
Winners: 2017, 2018
ANZ Championship
Minor premiers: 2016
Netball New Zealand Super Club
Winners: 2017
Individual Awards

References

External links
 Gina Crampton on Instagram
 Gina Crampton on Twitter

1991 births
Living people
New Zealand netball players
New Zealand international netball players
New Zealand international Fast5 players
Southern Steel players
Northern Stars players
ANZ Championship players
ANZ Premiership players
2019 Netball World Cup players
People educated at Wellington Girls' College
Otago Polytechnic alumni
University of Otago alumni
Sportspeople from Wellington City
Rugby union players' wives and girlfriends
Commonwealth Games bronze medallists for New Zealand
Commonwealth Games medallists in netball
Netball players at the 2022 Commonwealth Games
Medallists at the 2022 Commonwealth Games